Fast Life is the fourth studio album by American rapper Paul Wall. It was released on May 12, 2009, by Swishahouse, Asylum Records and Warner Bros. Records.

Background
Rapper Paul Wall spoke about the album Fast Life, about taking something stronger than his previous albums, with both his lyrics and its production; as well as cover several more topics:

I really stepped it up a lot lyrically because I wanted this record to show real strength and emotion because y'all know Rap is so deep at times and I took that opportunity to just write lyrics that told my story and showed people that I mean something deep which y'all never really realised but now realise, also on the production side we really stepped it up a lot. We worked with a lot of new producers, a lot of new artists that I didn't work with in the past, so they'll get to see a lot of different vibes that they might have not seen with me with past albums. Subject matter we went a little more in-depth, talked about a lot of different things that I never really spoke on—I might have mentioned it here and there but never really made whole songs about. I had a lot of fun working on the album.

"You're going to hear in-depth topics," he says, adding that he's been recording nonstop for the album for the last two years, a feat that has given him more than 50 songs to choose from. "You'll hear some stuff that you might not be used to hearing."

Singles
The album's lead single "Bizzy Body" featuring Webbie and Mouse, who is the producer by the latter on this track. It was released on December 2, 2008. The music video premiered on March 27, 2009 via MySpace.

The album's second single "Lemon Drop" featuring Baby Bash, was released on the same day as the music video on July 13, 2009.

The album's third single "Got to Get It" premiered on July 23, 2009, along with the accompanying music video.

The album's fourth single "I Need Mo" featuring Kobe, was released on the same day as the music video on September 24, 2009. With Paul Wall himself, he said that it was shot and filmed through his iPhone.

Track listing

Sample credits
"Daddy Wasn't Home" contains a sample of "Mama Raised Me" performed by Master P.

References

2009 albums
Paul Wall albums
Albums produced by Happy Perez
Asylum Records albums